Luhansk Raion is a prospective raion (district) of Luhansk Oblast, Ukraine. It was formally created in July 2020 as part of the reform of administrative divisions of Ukraine. The center of the raion is in the city of Luhansk. Population:  The area of raion is controlled by the Luhansk People's Republic, which continues to use the old, pre-2020 administrative divisions of Ukraine.

References

Raions of Luhansk Oblast
Ukrainian raions established during the 2020 administrative reform